Giampaolo Mazza (born 26 February 1956) is a former manager of the San Marino national football team. Mazza was in charge of the San Marino national team between 1998 and 2013. When not managing the team, Mazza works as a PE teacher at a school near San Marino. A former player who played as a midfielder, he was the longest serving manager in Europe, having spent 15 years managing San Marino. However, he retired in October, 2013 after only winning one game in his tenure.

Mazza was born in Genoa, Italy. Before going into management at the age of 21, Mazza was a player for Italian Serie C club San Marino Calcio. He was capped five times by San Marino in 1991.

Managerial statistics

References

External links
 
 
 http://metro.co.uk/2013/10/18/san-marino-coach-quits-after-earning-one-point-in-15-years-4152154/

1956 births
Living people
Footballers from Genoa
Sammarinese footballers
San Marino international footballers
Italian footballers
Italian people of Sammarinese descent
Association football midfielders
A.S.D. Victor San Marino players
Sammarinese football managers
A.S.D. Victor San Marino managers
San Marino national football team managers
Italian football managers
Italian expatriate football managers